Hải Lăng is a rural district of Quảng Trị province in the North Central Coast region of Vietnam. As of 2003 the district had a population of 100,854. The district covers an area of 491 km². The district capital lies at Diên Sanh.

References

Districts of Quảng Trị province